This is a list of individuals and events related to Azerbaijan in 2021.

Incumbents 

 President: Ilham Aliyev
 Vice President: Mehriban Aliyeva
 Prime Minister: Ali Asadov
 National Assembly Speaker: Sahiba Gafarova

Establishments

Disestablishments

Events

Ongoing 
 COVID-19 pandemic in Azerbaijan

January 

 18 January:
 COVID-19 pandemic: Mass COVID-19 vaccination begins in Azerbaijan, with Sinovac shots.
Russian Foreign Minister Sergey Lavrov says that Armenia has returned all Azerbaijani prisoners who were captured during the 2020 Nagorno-Karabakh war.
 21 January – The presidents of Azerbaijan and Turkmenistan, Ilham Aliyev and Gurbanguly Berdimuhamedow, reach an agreement to jointly develop a hydrocarbon field, which was disputed between the two countries for around 30 years, in the Caspian Sea.

February

March

April

May

June

July

August

September

October

November

December

Deaths

See also
 Outline of Azerbaijan
 Index of Azerbaijan-related articles
 List of Azerbaijan-related topics
 History of Azerbaijan

References

Notes

Citations

2021 in Azerbaijan
2020s in Azerbaijan
Years of the 21st century in Azerbaijan
Azerbaijan
Azerbaijan